Qualcomm code-excited linear prediction (QCELP), also known as Qualcomm PureVoice, is a speech codec developed in 1994 by Qualcomm to increase the speech quality of the IS-96A codec earlier used in CDMA networks. It was later replaced with EVRC since it provides better speech quality with fewer bits. The two versions, QCELP8 and QCELP13, operate at 8 and 13 kilobits per second (Kbit/s) respectively.

In CDMA systems, a QCELP vocoder converts a sound signal into a signal transmissible within a circuit. In wired systems, voice signals are generally sampled at 8 kHz (that is, 8,000 sample values per second) and then encoded by 8-bit quantization for each sample value. Such a system transmits at 64 kbit/s, an expensive rate in a wireless system. A QCELP vocoder with variable rates can reduce the rate enough to fit a wireless system by coding the information more efficiently. In particular, it can change its own coding rates based on the speaker's volume or pitch; a louder or higher-pitched voice requires a higher rate.

References
 https://web.archive.org/web/20130129041829/http://www.rfdh.com/ez/system/db/lib_jnl/upload/2489/[CSD9904]_QCELP_Vocoders_in_CDMA_Systems_Design.pdf
 Archived PureVoice encoder and player downloads

Speech codecs
Qualcomm